Ivan Matos Duarte Fidalgo (born 4 April 1992) is a Portuguese footballer who plays for Pampilhosa as a forward.

Football career
On 2 August 2015, Fidalgo made his professional debut with Mafra in a 2015–16 Taça da Liga match against Leixões.

References

External links

Stats and profile at LPFP 

1992 births
Living people
Sportspeople from Coimbra
Portuguese footballers
Association football forwards
Anadia F.C. players
FC Pampilhosa players
Sertanense F.C. players
C.D. Mafra players
A.R.C. Oleiros players
R.D. Águeda players
Liga Portugal 2 players